Harry Shiver (born July 13, 1946) is an American politician. He is a member of the Alabama House of Representatives from the 64th District, serving since 2006. He is a member of the Republican party. After the 2018 Stoneman Douglas High School shooting, Shiver came out against a proposal to arm teachers in Alabama, arguing that most women, and female teachers in particular, "are scared of guns," and should not be expected to carry them in classrooms.

References

Living people
Republican Party members of the Alabama House of Representatives
1946 births
21st-century American politicians